Hidenohana Yukihide (born 10 February 1965 as Yukihide Kikushima) is a former sumo wrestler from Nirasaki, Yamanashi, Japan. 

One of the few professional sumo wrestlers from Yamanashi Prefecture, he was recruited by yokozuna Wajima of the Hanakago stable. He made his professional debut in March 1980, alongside Kotofuji and future professional wrestler  but never reached the top division. His highest rank was jūryō 5. He reached the second division eight years after his professional debut. He won the jūryō division yūshō or championship in his debut tournament in the division (the first wrestler to achieve this since Kotochitose in 1979), but then never won another bout as a sekitori, as he suffered a left knee medial collateral ligament injury in training with members of the Nihon University sumo club (including later top division wrestler Daishoyama) and was forced to withdraw from the next tournament after ten straight losses. He had been ineligible for the kōshō seido rank protection as the injury had not taken place in a tournament, and he was demoted to makushita. He never managed to return to jūryō and retired from active competition in March 1994. He performed the yumitori-shiki bow-twirling ceremony from November 1990 to July 1991.

Career record

See also
Glossary of sumo terms
List of past sumo wrestlers
List of sumo tournament second division champions

References

1965 births
Living people
Japanese sumo wrestlers
Sumo people from Yamanashi Prefecture